Wyoming Highway 239 (WYO 239) is a  state road that in Lincoln County, Wyoming connects U.S. Route 89 (US 89) and Idaho State Highway 34 at the Idaho state line.

Route description
Wyoming Highway 239 travels from the Idaho State Line at Freedom east to US 89, just east of Freedom, between Etna and Thayne. 

WYO 239 becomes Idaho State Highway 34 when the roadway crosses the state line. ID 34 serves Soda Springs, Idaho.

Major intersections

References

Official 2003 State Highway Map of Wyoming

External links 

Wyoming State Routes
WYO 239 - US 89 to ID State Line (to ID 34

Transportation in Lincoln County, Wyoming
239